Simon Minton-Connell (born 26 April 1969) is a former professional Australian rules footballer who played in the Victorian Football League (VFL) and Australian Football League (AFL).

VFL/AFL career
Nephew of the great full-forward Peter Hudson and cousin of Paul Hudson, Minton-Connell was selected at pick 38 in the 1986 VFL Draft by Carlton Football Club. Minton-Connell eventually played for four different VFL/AFL clubs; Carlton, Sydney, Hawthorn and Western Bulldogs in his twelve-year career, amassing 112 games and 305 goals in the process. Despite this lack of career stability Minton-Connell was an effective forward judged by today's standards, despite being overshadowed by the more glamorous and prolific spearheads of the era. He played for  during a three-year period from 1992 until 1994 when the club won three consecutive wooden spoons, leading the club's goalkicking each year. He led the AFL reserves in goalkicking for his final season in 1998, with 59 goals.

Local league career
Retiring to local league football, Minton-Connell reached the 100-goal milestone for the Aberfeldie Football Club of the Essendon District Football League in 2002, ending the season with 121 majors after tearing a thigh muscle in the opening minutes of that year's Grand Final versus Oak Park.

References

1969 births
Living people
Carlton Football Club players
Hawthorn Football Club players
Sydney Swans players
Western Bulldogs players
Allies State of Origin players
Tasmanian State of Origin players
North Hobart Football Club players
Aberfeldie Football Club players
Australian rules footballers from Tasmania
Tasmanian Football Hall of Fame inductees